Shahid Ali Khan (Urdu: شاہد علی خان) is a Canada based singer in the Qawwali genre, a musical tradition that dates back over 700 years.

Biography
Shahid Ali Khan was born in Lahore, Pakistan, and brought up in a family of Qawwal musicians. He studied under Nusrat Fateh Ali Khan, and later performed with him. He started his singing with his uncle Mohammad Butta and Bashir Ahmed Qadri the famous qawals of Pakistan, He also performed in front of Queen Elizabeth in year 2002 at Coops Coliseum (Hamilton, Canada). In 2003, he worked with Jack Lenz ( Hollywood Music Composer), for Movie "Passion Of Christ" for Alaap of title soundtrack    

Shahid has appeared on OMNI's Television show Chardi Kalaa. He has sung on the show and has also been interviewed by the show host Sarabjeet Singh.

Shahid has also been involved with numerous multi-cultural initiatives, such as performing at Toronto's Yonge & Dundas Square as a headliner of the 'DesiFest' South Asian Canadian music festival.

In 2011, he performed in the IIFA awards Toronto and he performed in so many Sufi festivals to present his Qawali shows and he sang the soundtracks of so many documentaries worldwide, he even gave hi voice for the numerous soundtracks in Hollywood. He is living in Canada from last 21 years and doing his work. He has a Musical Group named "Mast Mast". In this group there are 10 members and 4 of them are his sons who are performing with him, and sang for the chorus for him.

His YouTube Channel " SK Shahid Ali Khan" is the main platform where he mostly released his songs, he uploaded he performing videos and other videos related to his work. For his daily shows he posted his videos and pictures on his Facebook page " Shahid Ali Khan".

Recordings
Shahid Ali Khan released his first CD in Canada in November 2006. The self-titled album is in the Qawwali music style - a tradition that dates back over 700 years.
 https://www.youtube.com/channel/UCGawgu0fcvEfNPyUW4wNKQg 

1.https://www.youtube.com/watch?v=ILRsG0ABHq4 - " Mere Watan Tere Bin"

 2. https://www.youtube.com/watch?v=N-dtk5mRq-0 - " Oh Mere Yaara" 

3. https://www.youtube.com/watch?v=F0omIhi15iU - " Sab ke Ali Hain" 

4. https://www.youtube.com/watch?v=5W_91HVuPAY 

5.https://www.youtube.com/watch?v=Ak7BoRCI7sk 

6. https://www.youtube.com/watch?v=VVOdEDDk8z0

See also
Music of Pakistan
List of Pakistani musicians
Qawwali
Nusrat Fateh Ali Khan

References

Pakistani qawwali singers
Living people
Year of birth missing (living people)